Tracy Stalls (born June 12, 1984) is an American female volleyball player. She was part of the United States women's national volleyball team. On the club level she played for Eczacibasi Sports Club in 2009.

See also
 :it:Tracy Stalls

References

Further reading
 Profile at FIVB.org
 Huskers.com
 Team USA.org
 SCFCA Volleyball.org
 World Of Volley Profile
 Texas Sports.com
 USA Today
 Ohio State Buckeyes
 Volleyball.org
 FIVB USA Team Roster

1984 births
Living people
American women's volleyball players
Volleyball players at the 2003 Pan American Games
Pan American Games bronze medalists for the United States
Place of birth missing (living people)
Pan American Games medalists in volleyball
Middle blockers
American expatriate sportspeople in Turkey
Expatriate volleyball players in Turkey
Medalists at the 2003 Pan American Games
Nebraska Cornhuskers women's volleyball players
American volleyball coaches